Shahrak-e Shahid Arman Aliverdi Metro Station is a station of Tehran Metro Line 4. It is located in Shahrak-e Ekbatan. It is located between Bimeh Metro Station to the southeast and Eram-e Sabz Metro Station to the north.

References 

Tehran Metro stations